Jovis Tholus is a volcano in the Tharsis quadrangle of Mars located at 18.41° N and  117.41° W.  It is 58.0 km across and was named after a classical albedo feature name.

It has a 28 km diameter caldera of five craters. 60 km away from the caldera is a 30 km diameter impact crater.

Gallery

References

See also

 Geology of Mars
 List of mountains on Mars by height
 Volcanoes on Mars
 Volcanology of Mars

Tharsis quadrangle
Volcanoes of Mars